Leo Chow Ka Lok (born 17 April 1999) is a Hong Kong professional footballer who currently plays as a midfielder for Hong Kong Premier League club Sham Shui Po.

Club career

Rangers
On 10 September 2020, Rangers' Director of Football Philip Lee declared that Chow would join the club.

Sham Shui Po
On 8 August 2022, Chow joined Sham Shui Po.

Honours

Club
Lee Man
Hong Kong Sapling Cup: 2017–18

References

External links
HKFA

Hong Kong footballers
Hong Kong Premier League players
Association football midfielders
Lee Man FC players
Sham Shui Po SA players
Hong Kong Rangers FC players
HK U23 Football Team players
1999 births
Living people